Garching-Forschungszentrum is a Munich U-Bahn station in Garching. It serves as the northern terminus of the U6 line of the Munich U-Bahn system. Opened in 2006, it serves the Campus Garching with its 7,500 employees and around 17,000 students.

See also
List of Munich U-Bahn stations

References

External links
Garching-Forschungszentrum Station Photos

Munich U-Bahn stations
Railway stations in Germany opened in 2006
Garching bei München